Droogmansia chevalieri is a plant in the legume family Fabaceae, native to West Africa.

Description
Droogmansia chevalieri grows as a woody herb. The leaves grow singly. The inflorescences are in the upper leaves and feature racemes of small flowers. The fruits are pod-shaped.

Distribution and habitat
Droogmansia chevalieri is native to Guinea, Sierra Leone and Ivory Coast.

Conservation
Droogmansia chevalieri is threatened by mining, railway construction, fires and agriculture. With these threats and the likely low species population, Droogmansia chevalieri is assessed as Endangered.

References

Desmodieae
Flora of Guinea
Flora of Sierra Leone
Flora of Ivory Coast
Plants described in 1909